Albert Pickles (born 1905) was an English professional footballer who played as an outside right.

Career
Born in Leeds, Pickles joined Bradford City from Castleford Town in March 1927. He made 2 league appearances for the club, before being released later in 1927.

Sources

References

1905 births
Date of death missing
English footballers
Castleford Town F.C. players
Bradford City A.F.C. players
English Football League players
Association football outside forwards